Alkalibacillus silvisoli is a Gram-positive, aerobic, rod-shaped, moderately halophilic, alkaliphilic and motile bacterium from the genus of Alkalibacillus which has been isolated from forest soil from Kawagoe in Japan.

References

 

Bacillaceae
Bacteria described in 2007